Herbert James Pilato (born October 9, 1960) is an American writer and talk show host best known for his books about classic television programming in the United States.

Biography

Early life and education
Herbert James Pilato was born on October 9, 1960, in Rochester, New York to Frances Mary Pilato (née Turri) and Herbert Pompeii Pilato. His parents were of Italian descent. He completed a bachelor's degree from Nazareth College of Rochester, and also attended the University of California, Los Angeles.

Career
An aspiring actor, he applied in late 1983 to become an NBC page, and was accepted six months later. He made uncredited appearances in several television shows, but never landed a breakthrough role. In 1989, he returned to Rochester to care for his aging parents and to write.

Pilato's all-time favorite TV show, the 1960s sitcom Bewitched, was the subject of his first book, The Bewitched Book, published in 1992. He followed it with a companion guide to the early 1970s television series Kung Fu. Writing for AsianWeek, Gerald Lim described The Kung Fu Book of Caine (1993) as, "everything and anything one could possibly want to know – and not want to know" on the subject, and "an overly heroic portrait of Caine". A second book about the series, The Kung Fu Book of Wisdom, followed in 1995. Pilato's subject expertise led to a gig as consultant on the 2005 film Bewitched, a re-imagining of the original series. A revised edition of his first book, retitled Bewitched Forever, was published in 2004.

Pilato told the Rochester Democrat and Chronicle that his usual practice when researching a show is to interview as many people involved with it as possible, and that directors, writers, and producers are often "more open to interviews as they don't get the chance to talk about themselves as much as actors". He also hires a team of fans to help with trivia. He started writing a book about The Six Million Dollar Man and The Bionic Woman in 1993, and finished it two years later, but it was not published until 2007, after he found a new publisher. Nearly half of the book is devoted to an episode-by-episode guide. Brett Taylor, of Video Watchdog, wrote that the volume, "earns its definitive title hands down; even for those with only a casual interest, it proves more diverting than one might expect". Another pop-culture/media tie-in book, about Life Goes On, quickly followed, as did as a book drawing on his experience as an NBC page.

In 2012, Pilato returned to Bewitched and its star Elizabeth Montgomery with his first biography, Twitch Upon a Star. Based to a great extent upon his four interviews with Montgomery, who died in 1995, Pilato's work explores her complicated life. A year later, he followed with The Essential Elizabeth Montgomery.

In 2019, Pilato published a biography of television star Mary Tyler Moore.
 
As of 2021, Pilato hosts Then Again with Herbie J Pilato, a talk show on Amazon Prime about classic TV.

Works

References

1960 births
20th-century American historians
20th-century American male writers
21st-century American biographers
21st-century American historians
21st-century American male writers
American male television writers
American television writers
Historians from New York (state)
Living people
Nazareth College (New York) alumni
Writers from Rochester, New York
American male biographers
American male non-fiction writers